Box Hill City Oval is an Australian rules football and cricket stadium located in Box Hill, Victoria, Australia. It is the home ground of the Box Hill Hawks Football Club which plays in the Victorian Football League, and the Box Hill Cricket Club which plays in the Victorian Sub-District Cricket Association.

Box Hill City Oval was officially opened in 1937. The capacity of the venue is approximately 10,000 people.  The largest official attendance at the ground was on 14 August 1983 when 6,200 people attended a VFA game between Box Hill and Oakleigh. In more recent times a crowd of 5,253 attended a VFL game between the Box Hill Hawks and Williamstown on 19 June 2005. On Melbourne Show Day 1953, the venue hosted a benefit game for the family of Ray Gibb, who had died in an accident in early September, between a combined – team and a Box Hill team augmented with VFL and VFA stars; the crowd at the time was estimated to be 6,000. The venue has two pavilions and terracing on the western wing, but no grandstand.

It is currently the second-choice venue, behind North Port Oval, for VFL finals; it usually hosts finals only in the first week, but also hosted the preliminary finals in 2010 when the North Port Oval surface was unplayable due to rain and overuse.

Major milestones

Sources

 "Box Hill Football Club Yearbook", Box Hill Football Club, Melbourne, 1951
 "Box Hill Football Club Souvenir History", Box Hill Football Club, Melbourne, 1961
 "Box Hill Football Club Souvenir History", Box Hill Football Club, Melbourne, 2000

Sports venues in Melbourne
Victorian Football League grounds
Buildings and structures in the City of Whitehorse
Sport in the City of Whitehorse